James or Jim Pearson may refer to:

Entertainment
James Pearson (painter) (died 1838), English glass painter
James Larkin Pearson (1879–1981), poet
James Anthony Pearson (born 1989), British actor
James Pearson, Ronnie Scott's Jazz Club's house pianist since 2006

Politics
James Pearson Wells (1822–1896), Ontario farmer and political figure
James Pearson (Nebraska politician) (1873–?), Nebraska politician and radio preacher
James B. Pearson (1920–2009), U.S. Senator from the state of Kansas

Sports
James Pearson (rugby union) (died 1915), Scotland rugby player
James Pearson (footballer, born 1905) (1905–1962), English footballer
James Pearson (footballer, born 1993), English footballer
James Pearson (Northamptonshire cricketer), English cricketer
James Pearson (cricketer, born 1983), English cricketer
Jim Pearson (born 1953), Scottish footballer
Jim Pearson (ice hockey) (born 1950), Canadian ice hockey defenceman
James Pearson (speedway rider) (born 2005), Australian speedway rider

Others
James Pearson (business advocate), CEO of the Australian Chamber of Commerce and Industry
James Pearson (engineer), British railway engineer and locomotive designer
James Pearson (VC) (1822–1900), Irish recipient of the Victoria Cross
James William Pearson (1895–1993), American World War I flying ace who served with the British
James Douglas Pearson (1911–1997), Orientalist librarian and bibliographer, compiler of Index Islamicus